Lene Glesåsen Storløkken (born 20 June 1981 in Lørenskog) is a Norwegian football player who played for the LSK Kvinner FK.

Career
Storløkken is a midfielder and her former clubs are Athene Moss, Setskog/Høland FK and Kurland FK.

International career
She played in the Norwegian team that finished fourth at the 2007 FIFA Women's World Cup in China.

She also competed at the 2008 Summer Olympics in Beijing, where Norway reached the quarter finals (and lost to Brazil). Since her debut in 2006, Storløkken has played 65 A games for the Norway women's national football team, scoring six goals—the first against Finland women's national football team in the 2007 Algarve Cup. She has also played 45 games for the four Norwegian youth national teams. Storløkken missed the 2011 FIFA Women's World Cup through injury.

Personal life
She is the twin sister of professional female footballer Hege Storløkken.

References

External links

Living people
Norwegian women's footballers
1981 births
Women's association football midfielders
Norway women's international footballers
2007 FIFA Women's World Cup players
People from Lørenskog
Athene Moss players
Sportspeople from Viken (county)